Neelam is an upcoming Indian Tamil-language drama film directed by Venkatesh Kumar. It is a Tamil film based in the context of the Sri Lankan Civil War and the rise of Tamil rebel groups including the Tamil Tigers. The film was refused clearance and banned by the Censor board of India as it on the grounds it would damage ties with Sri Lanka. The film features the song 'Alayae o Alayae' by M. S. Viswanathan which was his last song before his demise.

Cast
 Sree as Siva
 Pavithra
 Jagan as Nandu
 Vijay Kumar as yara
 Bala Singh as Kuppathu Thalaivar

References

External links
Indiaglitz.com
Chennaionline.com
Moviegalleri.net
Indiancinemagallery.com
Movies.sulekha.com
Videos.behindwoods.com
Pluzmedia.in

2013 films
2010s Tamil-language films
Films about the Sri Lankan Civil War